Gauhati, also spelt Guwahati, is a Lok Sabha constituency in Assam.

Assembly segments
Gauhati Lok Sabha constituency is composed of the following assembly segments:

Members of Parliament

^ by-poll

Election results

2019 General Elections

16th Lok Sabha: 2014 Lok Sabha Elections

1956 by-election
In 1956, a bye-election was held. The election was won by the INC candidate Devendra Nath Sarma with 45057 votes, against Hem Barua of Praja Socialist Party with 29112 votes.

See also
 Gauhati
 List of Constituencies of the Lok Sabha

References

Guwahati
Lok Sabha constituencies in Assam
1952 establishments in Assam
Constituencies established in 1952